Confederate memorial may refer to

 The former Confederate Memorial Home, renamed Confederate Memorial Hall, in Washington, D.C.
 The Confederate Memorial Hall Museum, in New Orleans, Louisiana
 The former Confederate Memorial Hall, now Memorial Hall, Vanderbilt University, Nashville, Tennessee
 Any of the thousands of Confederate monuments which exist in the United States (see List of Confederate monuments and memorials)
 Any of a growing list of removed Confederate monuments (see Removal of Confederate monuments and memorials)